Beauties on Bicycles (Italian: Bellezze in ) is a 1951 Italian comedy film directed by Carlo Campogalliani and starring Silvana Pampanini and Delia Scala. It was filmed at the Cinecittà Studios in Rome with sets designed by Alfredo Montori. The film was one of the more popular productions released that year and was a financial success.

Two young women travelling towards Milan to try to secure roles in a new musical comedy show enjoy a series of adventures which involve pretending to be soldiers and taking party in a bicycle race.

Partial cast
Silvana Pampanini as  Silvana
Delia Scala as  Delia
Franca Marzi as Maria
Peppino De Filippo as First thief
Renato Rascel as The mechanic's son
Aroldo Tieri as Aroldo
Carlo Ninchi as The manager
Carlo Croccolo as Pinotto
Arnoldo Foà as The sergeant
Luigi Pavese as Reporter
Dante Maggio as  Second thief
Carlo Romano as  Darelli Manager
Renato Valente as Giulio Darelli
Oscar Andriani
Nico Pepe
Nerio Bernardi

References

Bibliography
 Parish, Robert. Film Actors Guide. Scarecrow Press, 1977.

External links 
 

1951 films
Italian comedy films
1950s Italian-language films
Italian black-and-white films
1951 comedy films
Films set in Italy
Films directed by Carlo Campogalliani
Cycling films
Films with screenplays by Mario Amendola
Films shot at Cinecittà Studios
1950s Italian films